The Grammy Award for Best Contemporary Jazz Album was an award presented at the Grammy Awards, a ceremony that was established in 1958 and originally called the Gramophone Awards, to recording artists for works (songs or albums) containing quality contemporary jazz performances. Honors in several categories are presented at the ceremony annually by The Recording Academy to "honor artistic achievement, technical proficiency and overall excellence in the recording industry, without regard to album sales or chart position".

Originally called the Grammy Award for Best Contemporary Jazz Performance, the award was first presented to the Manhattan Transfer in 1992. From 1993 to 1994 the category was known as Best Contemporary Jazz Performance (Instrumental), from 1995 to 2000 the name changed to Best Contemporary Jazz Performance, and since 2001 the name of the category has been Best Contemporary Jazz Album. Until 2001, both albums and singles were eligible for this award. According to the category description guide for the 52nd Grammy Awards, the award is presented for albums containing "at least 51% playing time of newly recorded contemporary jazz instrumental tracks". Beginning in 2001, award recipients included the producers, engineers, and/or mixers associated with the nominated work in addition to the recording artists.

As of 2011, Pat Metheny holds the record for the most wins in this category, with a total of six (five times with the Pat Metheny Group). Randy Brecker has received the award four times total, once along with his brother Michael as the duo known as Brecker Brothers. The group Béla Fleck and the Flecktones has received the award twice. American artists have been presented with the award more than any other nationality, though it has been presented once to Joe Zawinul, born in Austria. The group Yellowjackets holds the record for the most nominations without a win, with a total of seven. In 2012, the award was discontinued in a major overhaul of Grammy categories. From 2012, contemporary jazz recordings were shifted to the newly formed Best Jazz Instrumental Album category.

Recipients

 Each year is linked to the article about the Grammy Awards held that year.

References

 
1992 establishments in the United States
2011 disestablishments in the United States
Awards disestablished in 2011
Awards established in 1992
Contemporary Jazz Album